
Akhet (Gardiner:N27) is an Egyptian hieroglyph that represents the sun rising over a mountain. It is translated as "horizon" or "the place in the sky where the sun rises". Betrò describes it as "Mountain with the Rising Sun" (The hieroglyph for "mountain" is 𓈋) and an ideogram for "horizon".

Akhet appears in the Egyptian name for the Great Pyramid of Giza (Akhet Khufu), and in the assumed name of Akhetaten, the city founded by pharaoh Akhenaten. It also appears in the name of the syncretized form of Ra and Horus, Ra-Horakhty ("Ra–Horus of the Horizons").

In ancient Egyptian architecture, the pylon mirrored the hieroglyph. The symbol is sometimes connected with the astrological sign of Libra and the Egyptian deity Aker, who guards the eastern and western horizons.

References

Citations

Bibliography 

 
 
 
 
 
 

Ancient Egyptian culture
Egyptian hieroglyphs: sky-earth-water